The men's pole vault event at the 1987 Pan American Games was held in Indianapolis, United States on 15 August.

Results

References

Athletics at the 1987 Pan American Games
1987